The kidnapping of Amber Swartz-Garcia (born August 19, 1980) occurred on June 3, 1988 in Pinole, California when she was seven-years-old. She had been playing jump rope in her front yard when she was abducted.

Amber was the daughter of Bernie Swartz, a police officer, and Kim Swartz. Her father was shot and killed four months before her birth, and her mother then lived with Al Garcia, and Amber took his last name.

Disappearance and possible killer 
Over the years, the police announced that suspects, including a volunteer who helped search for missing children and a defrocked priest had been questioned intensively in the kidnapping.

In 2009, Pinole police and the FBI announced that her killer was convicted murderer Curtis Dean Anderson, who died in prison in 2007 one month after confessing to her kidnapping and murder. Anderson had a long criminal record and had been convicted of kidnapping and murdering Xiana Fairchild of Vallejo, California, who was also seven years old, and also of kidnapping and sexually assaulting another girl, who escaped. He had bragged about kidnapping eleven girls.

Investigation and aftermath 
Anderson told FBI agents that he sedated Amber while he drove to Arizona to visit his aunt. He said that he killed Amber in a motel room near Tucson, Arizona and disposed of her body near Benson, Arizona.

No human remains or credible evidence of Amber's death has been found, other than Anderson's confession. As a result of his confession the case was declared closed. Kim Swartz was convinced that Anderson was lying to get attention. In 2013, after a petition campaign, the Pinole police agreed to re-open the case.

See also 

 Disappearance of Michaela Garecht
 Kidnapping of Jaycee Dugard
 List of kidnappings
 List of people who disappeared

References 

1980s missing person cases
1988 crimes in the United States
Crimes in the San Francisco Bay Area
Kidnapped American children
Missing American children
Missing person cases in California
Incidents of violence against girls
Pinole, California
1988 in California
June 1988 events in the United States